Lvovka is a rural locality (a village) in Pugachevsky Selsoviet, Fyodorovsky District, Bashkortostan, Russia. The population was 18 as of 2010. There is 1 street. It takes its name from the Ukrainian city Lviv.

Geography 
Lvovka is located 51 km southeast of Fyodorovka (the district's administrative centre) by road.

References 

Rural localities in Fyodorovsky District